The 2007 Enugu State gubernatorial election was the 4th gubernatorial election of Enugu State. Held on April 14, 2007, the People's Democratic Party nominee Sullivan Chime won the election, defeating Ugochukwu Agballa of the Accord.

Results 
Sullivan Chime from the People's Democratic Party won the election, defeating Ugochukwu Agballa from the Accord. Registered voters was 1,201,697.

References 

Enugu State gubernatorial elections
Enugu gubernatorial
April 2007 events in Nigeria